Borko Paštrović (Борко Паштровић; April 12, 1875—December 18, 1912) was a Serbian Chetnik commander and later a major of artillery in the Serbian Army during the First Balkan War.

Life

Paštrović was born in Kragujevac, Principality of Serbia (now Serbia) on April 12, 1875. After finishing six years of gymnasium in Kruševac, he attended the Military Academy in Belgrade. On April 16, 1905, as a lieutenant in the Kragujevac Chetnik armed band he participated in the Battle of Čelopek against forces of the Ottoman Army, alongside commanders Doksim Mihailović, Savatije Milošević, Lazar Kujundžić, Vojislav Tankosić, Aksentije Bacetović and Pavle Mladenović. He also participated in the First Balkan War, during which he commanded an artillery detachment of the Serbian Army. In Lješ, on the Adriatic, they clashed with Essad Pasha who tried to withdraw from Scutari after a long siege. Paštrović was killed in the fighting on December 18, 1912.

References

Sources

„Борко Паштровић“. Народна енциклопедија. 1927.

1875 births
1912 deaths
Military personnel from Kragujevac
People from the Principality of Serbia
Serbian rebels
Serbian military personnel of the Balkan Wars
Serbian military personnel killed in action
20th-century Serbian people